Interprets Great Music Great Films Great Sounds is an album by American composer and arranger Nelson Riddle of songs from contemporaneous motion pictures. The album also contains five songs from the 1935 Rodgers and Hart musical Jumbo, as well as a Roger Edens song written for the 1962 film version of the same musical.

In the October 31, 1964 edition of Billboard magazine, Interprets Great Music Great Films Great Sounds was listed as a popular album with commercial potential.

Track listing
 "Charade" (Henry Mancini, Johnny Mercer)
 "Theme from Stowaway In The Sky" (Jean Prodromidès)
 "Love Theme from Taras Bulba ("The Wishing Star")" (Franz Waxman)
 "Love Song from Mutiny on the Bounty ("Follow Me")" (Bronisław Kaper)
 "Sawdust and Spangles and Dreams" (Roger Edens)
 "It's a Mad, Mad, Mad, Mad World" (Ernest Gold, Mack David)
 "Little Girl Blue" (Rodgers, Hart)
 "The Most Beautiful Girl In the World" (Rodgers, Hart)
 "Over and Over Again" (Rodgers, Hart)
 "My Romance" (Rodgers, Hart)
 "This Can't Be Love" (Rodgers, Hart)

Personnel
Nelson Riddle – arranger

References

External links
 

1965 albums
Albums arranged by Nelson Riddle
Albums produced by Sonny Burke
Instrumental albums
Nelson Riddle albums
Reprise Records albums